Cortsville is an unincorporated community in Clark County, in the U.S. state of Ohio.

History
The first settlement at Cortsville was made in 1830. A post office called Cortsville was established in 1837, and remained in operation until 1841. In 1881, Cortsville had 57 inhabitants.

References

Unincorporated communities in Clark County, Ohio
1830 establishments in Ohio
Populated places established in 1830
Unincorporated communities in Ohio